Fukushima Station is the name of multiple train stations in Japan:

Fukushima Station (Fukushima) in Fukushima, Fukushima
Fukushima Station (Osaka) in Osaka
Kiso-Fukushima Station in Nagano

It may also refer to a station (stop where inns could be found) along the roadway:
 Fukushima-juku in Nagano